Gisela Mosig (November 29, 1930 – January 12, 2003) was a German-American molecular biologist best known for her work with enterobacteria phage T4. She was among the first investigators to recognize the importance of recombination intermediates in establishing new DNA replication forks, a fundamental process in DNA replication.

Early years
While growing up on a farm in Saxony, Mosig became interested in biology and physics. After World War II, the region where she lived became part of East Germany and evolutionary teaching in her high school skewed toward Lysenkoism. Finding the intellectual atmosphere intolerable, she fled to the west on her bicycle with only the belongings she could carry. After undergraduate studies at the University of Bonn, she earned her doctoral degree in plant genetics at the University of Cologne in 1959.

From there, she was recruited to Vanderbilt University to study bacteriophage T4, a topic for which she became a leading investigator. After postdoctoral research at Vanderbilt and then the Carnegie Institute of Washington at Cold Spring Harbor (with Nobel laureate A. D. Hershey), she returned to Vanderbilt as a faculty member in 1965, and became a citizen of the United States of America in 1968. Mosig served on the Vanderbilt faculty until her death in 2003.

Recognition
 Outstanding Graduate Teaching Award (Vanderbilt, 1989) 
 Elected Fellow of the American Academy of Microbiology (1994)
 Earl Sutherland Prize for Achievement in Research (Vanderbilt, 1995)

Death
Mosig died at Alive Hospice in Nashville a few years after being diagnosed with metastatic ovarian cancer. She was 72 years old. In her will she endowed a fund to support scholarly travel for Vanderbilt graduate students in the biological sciences.

Key publications

References

1930 births
2003 deaths
Scientists from Saxony
20th-century American women scientists
Deaths from ovarian cancer
Deaths from cancer in Tennessee
Women molecular biologists
Phage workers
American molecular biologists
American geneticists
American virologists
German emigrants to the United States
German molecular biologists
People with acquired American citizenship
21st-century American women